Anwar Hussein (born 1938) is a Tanganyika-born British photo journalist and author.  In 2016 he became the longest-serving photographer covering the British royal family and Queen Elizabeth II.  Hussein is notable for changing perceptions of royal family through the use of casual photographs instead of formal portrait photography.

Two of Hussein's sons went on to become royal photographers, but working independently from Hussein.  His photographs have been used by Queen Elizabeth II and the Queen Mother for their Christmas cards.

Samir Hussein 
Amwar Hussein's son Samir Hussein works as a royal photographer. He has won Arts and Entertainment Photographer of the Year at the Picture Editor Awards on three occasions UK Picture Editors' Guild. In 2020 he was crowned Royal Photographer of the Year by the BPPA (British Press Photographers Association). 

Samir's photography was exhibited, along with his father and brother, in Santa Monica in February 2022. The exhibit featured their photographs of Princess Diana and the Royal Family.

The exhibit shared "collections of their original images and the intimate, never-before-told stories behind them. The Husseins collectively spent four decades working side by side with the iconic Princess and her family and will reveal what they witnessed first-hand, both in public and private moments.”

References

Further reading

  Charles, Prince of Wales
  Prince Andrew, Duke of York
  Pope John Paul II's visit to Ireland
  Pope John Paul II's visit to France
   Pope John Paul II's visit to the United Kingdom
 
  Prince William, Duke of Cambridge
  Diana, Princess of Wales.

External links
 
 

Tanzanian emigrants to the United Kingdom
1938 births
Living people